The 1992–93 season of the Balkans Cup club tournament was the 27th season of the competition. It was won by Greek side Edessaikos in the final against Bulgarian Etar Veliko Tarnovo for their first title in the competition.

Quarter-finals

|}

First leg

Second leg

Teuta Durrës won 2–1 on aggregate.

Etar Veliko Tarnovo won 6–5 on aggregate.

Semi-finals

|}

First leg

Second leg

Etar Veliko Tarnovo won 2–1 on aggregate.

Edessaikos 2–2 Teuta Durrës on aggregate. Edessaikos  won 5–3 on penalties.

Final

|}

First leg

Second leg

Edessaikos won 3–2 on aggregate.

References

1992–93
1992–93 in European football
1992–93 in Albanian football
1992–93 in Bulgarian football
1992–93 in Greek football
1992–93 in Romanian football
1992–93 in Turkish football